East Sydney was an electoral district for the Legislative Assembly, in the Australian colony of New South Wales created in 1859 from part of the Electoral district of Sydney City, covering the eastern part of the current Sydney central business district, Woolloomooloo, Potts Point, Elizabeth Bay and Darlinghurst, bordered by George Street to the east, Boundary Street to the west, and, from the creation of South Sydney in 1880, Liverpool Street and Oxford Street, to the south. It elected four members simultaneously, with voters casting four votes and the first four candidates being elected. For the 1894 election, it was replaced by the single-member electorates of Sydney-King, Sydney-Fitzroy and Sydney-Bligh.

Members for East Sydney

Election results

References

Former electoral districts of New South Wales
1859 establishments in Australia
1894 disestablishments in Australia
Constituencies established in 1859
Constituencies disestablished in 1894